The 2021 Alsco Uniforms 250 was a NASCAR Xfinity Series race held on June 12, 2021. It was contested over 171 laps—extended from 167 laps due to an overtime finish—on the  oval. It was the fourteenth race of the 2021 NASCAR Xfinity Series season. Joe Gibbs Racing driver Kyle Busch collected his second win of the season, and the 99th of his career.

Report

Background 
Texas Motor Speedway is a speedway located in the northernmost portion of the U.S. city of Fort Worth, Texas – the portion located in Denton County, Texas. The track measures 1.5 miles (2.4 km) around and is banked 24 degrees in the turns, and is of the oval design, where the front straightaway juts outward slightly. The track layout is similar to Atlanta Motor Speedway and Charlotte Motor Speedway (formerly Lowe's Motor Speedway). The track is owned by Speedway Motorsports, Inc., the same company that owns Atlanta and Charlotte Motor Speedways, as well as the short-track Bristol Motor Speedway.

Entry list 

 (R) denotes rookie driver.
 (i) denotes driver who is ineligible for series driver points.

Qualifying
A. J. Allmendinger was awarded the pole for the race as determined by competition-based formula. Dillon Bassett and Timmy Hill did not have enough points to qualify for the race.

Starting Lineups

Race

Race results

Stage Results 
Stage One
Laps: 40

Stage Two
Laps: 40

Final Stage Results 

Laps: 87

Race statistics 

 Lead changes: 14 among 8 different drivers
 Cautions/Laps: 10 for 52
 Time of race: 2 hours, 22 minutes, and 48 seconds
 Average speed:

References 

2021 in sports in Texas
Alsco Uniforms 250
2021 NASCAR Xfinity Series
NASCAR races at Texas Motor Speedway